Arif Ozakca (born 1979 in London, England) is a British artist who combines montages with painting. His work is influenced by his Anglo-Turkish-Cypriot heritage by emphasising the differences between Ottoman culture and Baroque culture; thus, his work illustrates the experience of living between two cultures in two worlds. In 2009, Ozakca participated in a group exhibition called the "Newspeak: British Art Now" which was organized by Saatchi Gallery at the Hermitage Museum in St. Petersburg.

References

External links 
Arif Ozakca at Art News

1979 births
British artists
Artists from London
British people of Turkish Cypriot descent
Living people
Alumni of Chelsea College of Arts